Charles Phillip Tilghman (April 29, 1911 - July 11, 1988) was the founder of the Sphinx Club, a major Baltimore jazz venue one of the first African American-owned nightclubs in the country. Tilghman ran the Sphinx Club until he died in 1988, and the Club shut down in 1992.

References

Baltimore Jazz

1911 births
1988 deaths
Businesspeople from Baltimore
Culture of Baltimore
20th-century American businesspeople